Trimethylphenol may refer to:

 2,4,6-Trimethylphenol
 2,3,6-Trimethylphenol
 2,3,5-Trimethylphenol
 3,4,5-Trimethylphenol